The Albert Smith Memorial Medal is the award given to the Man of the Match in the final of the Camanachd Cup, the blue riband trophy of the sport of shinty.  It has been presented every year since 1972 by the Smith family of Fort William in honour of Albert Smith Sr. (Born in 1888, Lochuanagan, Fort Augustus.)  The widow of his only son, John Victor Smith, currently presents the medal. Albert Sr.'s grandson, Victor Smith is a former player for Fort William Shinty Club but never won the medal despite featuring as a key player in several Fort William wins. Victor Smith currently coaches Fort William Shinty Club along with his cousin Adi Robertson. Victor's son, John Victor Smith, plays full forward for the Fort.

Previous Winners

1972   John Campbell Newtonmore

1973   Kenny MacNiven Glasgow Mid-Argyll

1974   Tommy Nicolson Kyles Athletic

1975   Duncan MacNeil Kyles Athletic

1976   Neil Blair Kyles Athletic

1977   John Mackenzie Newtonmore

1978   Hugh Chisholm Newtonmore

1979   David "Tarzan" Ritchie  Newtonmore

1980   George Nicolson Kyles Athletic

1981   Ricky Ross Newtonmore

1982   John Fraser Newtonmore

1983   Ewan Paterson Strachur

1984   John Russell Newtonmore

1985   Norman MacArthur Newtonmore

1986   Gordon MacIntyre Oban Camanachd

1987   David Anderson Kingussie

1988   Ali MacKintosh Glenurquhart

1989   Hugh Chisholm Newtonmore

1990   Willie Macrae Skye

1991   Rory Fraser Kingussie

1992   Willie MacDonald Fort William

1993   Nonnie MacInnes Oban Camanachd

1994   Andy Irvine Kyles Athletic

1995   Nonnie MacInnes Oban Camanachd

1996   Nonnie MacInnes Oban Camanachd

1997   Rory Fraser Kingussie

1998   Ronald Ross Kingussie

1999   Fraser Inglis Oban Camanachd

2000   Kenny MacDonald Kyles Athletic

2001   Scott MacNeil Oban Camanachd

2002   Ronald Ross Kingussie

2003   Ali Borthwick Kingussie

2004   Douglas Dando Inveraray

2005   Gary Innes Fort William

2006   Ronald Ross Kingussie

2007   James Clark Fort William

2008   James Clark Fort William

2009   Donald Irvine Kyles Athletic

2010   Gary Innes Fort William

2011   Norman Campbell Newtonmore

2012   Roddy MacDonald Kyles Athletic

2013   Jamie Robinson Newtonmore

2014   Ronald Ross Kingussie

2015   Stuart Macdonald Lovat

2016   Andy MacKintosh Newtonmore

References

External links
 Newtonmore Albert Smith winners

Shinty